State Route 370 (SR 370) is  long north–south state highway in the western part of the U.S. state of Ohio.

SR 370 was established in the middle of the 1930s.  A spur route, it connects John Bryan State Park to the state highway system.  This two-lane highway is located in the northern portion of Greene County.

Route description
The entire  length of SR 370 exists within the boundaries of Miami Township in northern Greene County. As it travels to the north, SR 370 passes amidst a blend of open fields and woods, with a number of houses appearing alongside the highway. It arrives at its northern terminus where it intersects SR 343.

According to a 2008 survey by the Ohio Department of Transportation, an average of 250 passenger vehicles and 10 commercial vehicles travel the length of SR 370 on a daily basis.  This route is not included as a part of the National Highway System.

History
SR 370 was established in 1934.  Throughout its history, SR 370 has served as a spur route off of SR 343 that provides access to John Bryan State Park.  When it was first designated, the entirety of the route was a gravel roadway.  The highway was paved by 1941.  Since that time, the route has not experienced any changes of major significance.

Major intersections

References

External links

370
Transportation in Greene County, Ohio